MOST may refer to:

Organizations
 MOST nezavisnih lista, political party in Croatia
 Milton J. Rubenstein Museum of Science and Technology, a museum in Syracuse, New York, US
 Ministry of Science and Technology, a ministry or other government agency
 MOST (Association, Serbia) a Non-governmental Citizen's association from Serbia
 Music & Opera Singers Trust, an opera and classic music organisation in Australia that created the Opera Awards
 Management of Social Transformations, a program of the UNESCO

Science and technology
 Maynard Operation Sequence Technique, a work measurement system
 Media Oriented Systems Transport, an electronic bus type architecture for on-board audio-visual devices, primarily in automobiles
 Microvariability and Oscillations of STars telescope, a stellar photometric monitoring satellite built by Canada
 Molonglo Observatory Synthesis Telescope, a radio telescope in Australia
 MOST (ATM Network) a defunct network of bank Automatic Teller Machines on the East Coast of the United States

See also
 Most (disambiguation)